Major League Wrestling (MLW) is an American professional wrestling promotion based in New Rochelle, New York. The promotion was founded in 2002 in Philadelphia, Pennsylvania by former WWE writer Court Bauer. The promotion markets its product as "Hybrid Wrestling", with its roster featuring a mix of different wrestling styles.

The promotion originally ran live events between 2002 and 2004, with these events seen on the television series, MLW Underground TV. MLW returned to promoting events in July 2017, with a new weekly television show named MLW Fusion premiering in April 2018.

History

Formation (2002–2004) 
Following the closures and acquisitions of World Championship Wrestling (WCW) and Extreme Championship Wrestling (ECW) by the World Wrestling Federation (WWF, now known as the WWE) in 2001, Major League Wrestling (MLW) was founded in 2002. Shortly after its founding, the promotion spent three months moving their headquarters from Philadelphia to New York. MLW styled itself as an alternative to WWE's sports entertainment, following in the tradition of ECW.

In 2003, MLW again moved their base of operations to Florida, and negotiated a deal with Sunshine Network to air a television series titled Underground TV, which ran between April 7, 2003 and February 14, 2004. The series was hosted by Joey Styles, later replaced by Kevin Kelly, and consisted of pre-taped matches from prior events. Furthering MLW's ties to ECW, the promotion highlighted many former ECW talents, such as Sabu, Terry Funk, Shane Douglas, and Steve Corino. This led to criticism of MLW for being an imitation of ECW in comparison to Ring of Honor, another Philadelphia-founded promotion that launched five months prior to MLW's formation.

After shuttering in 2004 , Major League Wrestling would return in 2011 as a podcast network, initially focused on producing broadcast and digital content relating to the professional wrestling industry. Many prominent professional wrestling figures have appeared on the network, including former WWE and WCW stars Kevin Sullivan, Jim Duggan, MVP, current WWE executive Bruce Prichard, former WCW and current AEW commentator Tony Schiavone, former WCW and WWE manager Jim Cornette, and former WCW President and WWE executive Eric Bischoff.

Revival (2017–present)

Return and expansion 
In 2017, MLW announced that it would once again be promoting wrestling events. Tickets for their first event, MLW One-Shot, went on sale on July 21, 2017. In the same year, MLW announced it would run more shows in Orlando in 2018. Given the success of their independent outings, MLW was able to secure a television deal with beIN Sports for a new program, titled MLW Fusion, which debuted on April 20, 2018 on beIN Sports USA. Their first episode featured Pentagon Jr. against Fenix as the main event.

In July 2018, the inaugural Battle Riot would air as a Fusion television special. MLW began introducing contracts as part of their growth strategy. In August, the promotion started a working agreement with Mexican-based promotion Lucha Libre AAA Worldwide (AAA). On September 19, it was announced that MLW expanded its partnership with beIN Sports to air Fusion in Spanish.

In October, MLW announced a Halloween-themed, Fusion television special, and announced the signings of PCO and Richard Holliday as full-time members of the roster on October 18. It was also reported that Court Bauer and several MLW executives would travel to Monaco for Sportel, with intentions of making a big push internationally. Also announced was a project between MLW and Spiff TV.

On November 8, 2018, MLW held a Fusion television taping, named Fightland, in Chicago at Cicero Stadium. Bauer claimed that the event drew the highest attendance in MLW history, shattering the previous attendance record of 1,536 people for the June 20, 2003 event, Hybrid Hell, in Florida. On November 29, Bauer announced that Fusion would be broadcast live on beIN Sports on December 14. This coincided with their two-day television tapings in Miami: "Never Say Never" and "Zero Hour"; the live episode was an hour of "Zero Hour"'s events.

MLW continued to air live Fusion specials throughout 2019, including SuperFight in February and Intimidation Games in March. The company brought former manager Jim Cornette on as a color commentator starting March 2, 2019. He continued to work for the company for Rise of the Renegades, Battle Riot II, and Fury Road. He also worked unofficially in an agent-like role for the company. This includes coaching younger talent on their television presentation and promos. In addition to SuperFight and Intimidation Games, Rise of the Renegades and Battle Riot II were all revealed to have sold out. 

In April 2019, MLW would move their operations into a corporate office building in New Rochelle, New York. On April 18, MLW announced the creation of a new title: the MLW National Openweight Championship, with the inaugural champion to be crowned during Fury Road in Waukesha, Wisconsin. In June 2019, International Wrestling Association (IWA-PR) owner Savio Vega was brought in as an on-air talent and backstage agent. This working relationship resulted in the use of the IWA Caribbean Heavyweight Championship in MLW storylines. On August 18, 2019, MLW teased the formation of its women's division, later announcing its official launch on October 18, 2019. The division's first official match would be later held at MLW Blood and Thunder on November 9, 2019.

On July 5, it was announced that MLW would hold its first pay-per-view event, Saturday Night SuperFight, which would be held on November 2. On July 26, MLW announced a working agreement with Japanese-based promotion Pro Wrestling Noah, which would include a talent-exchange agreement and content collaboration between the two promotions. On August 8, MLW announced that they had reached a new deal with FITE TV to carry MLW pay-per-view events, with the first event being Saturday Night SuperFight. Four days later, MLW announced a working relationship with Mexican-based promotion The Crash Lucha Libre termed as a "strategic alliance". On August 23, MLW and The Crash announced they would co-promote their first event on October 5 at the Auditorio Fausto Gutierrez in Tijuana, Mexico.

On February 1, 2020, MLW announced a working relationship with Japanese promotion Dragon Gate (DG), which would include a talent-exchange between the two promotions.

Effects of COVID-19 
After AAA vs MLW on March 13, 2020, MLW would take a six-month hiatus due to the COVID-19 pandemic. On April 21, MLW announced they had begun digitizing the 2003–2004 tape library, including the complete run of MLW Underground TV. On April 30, MLW announced a limited series titled MLW Anthology to air on Bein Sports starting May 16, 2020. Following the last episode of Fusion on May 9, 2020, a new digital spinoff series titled Pulp Fusion would launch on MLW's YouTube channel beginning on May 29, 2020.

On June 9, 2020, MLW reached a new media rights deal to stream their programming on DAZN. CEO Court Bauer also announced during the same month that reruns of MLW Underground TV would air on Bein Sports throughout the summer.

In August 2020, MLW announced that Fusion TV tapings will resume in October of that year. On September 10, it was announced that MLW Fusion would move to Wednesday nights on fubo Sports Network. On October 10, it was revealed that Fusion would return on November 18 at 7pm EST and new episodes would also premiere on MLW's YouTube channel on the same night.

In October 2020, MLW announced a "strategic alliance" with IWA-PR for the “celebration of inter-promotional events, direct support to the events of each of the companies and collaboration in other types of promotions”. MLW would also began incorporating story elements from the now-defunct Lucha Libre promotion and television drama, Lucha Underground, into an angle involving IWA-PR. Talent formally associated with Lucha Underground were brought into MLW as part of the "Azteca Underground" stable. 

In April 2021, MLW announced a television deal with Vice TV. A block of MLW programming, including reruns of Fusion, began airing on Saturdays starting May 1. The agreement would further expand when it was announced on September 17 that Vice would air MLW Fightland as a television special on October 7.

On the April 21, episode of MLW Fusion, Bauer announced that MLW's "new season" would begin with their July 10, 2021 event at the 2300 Arena in Philadelphia, later revealed to be Battle Riot III, and it would be their first event since the pandemic to have a live audience in attendance. On April 29, 2021, MLW announced a partnership with Revolution Pro Wrestling.

In June 2021, Wrestling Observer reported that MLW had ended its deal with DAZN. it was also reported that MLW had begun taping content in Los Angeles for a spinoff series that would "resemble Lucha Underground", with plans to film vignettes in the summer and matches in the fall. It would later be revealed on August 4, 2021 that MLW had signed a deal to produce a new series centered around Azteca Underground, featuring a different roster from that seen on MLW Fusion. In an update during Wrestling Observer Radio on November 1, 2021, Meltzer reported that tapings for the series were cancelled because MLW was unable to secure a TV deal.

On July 7, 2021, it was announced that Shimmer Women Athletes co-founder Dave Prazak had joined MLW to help relaunch its women's division; later to be announced in September as the MLW Women's Featherweight division. 

During the television premiere of Battle Riot III on July 24, 2021, MLW announced a new season of Fusion to air on "a new home" in the Fall, and a new, four-part mini-series titled MLW Fusion: Alpha. Initially announced to air in August, Fusion: Alpha was later announced as "a new season and series from MLW" to premiere on September 22 on MLW's YouTube channel, and would air on Saturdays and Mondays on Bein Sports.

On December 7, 2021, MLW announced a new "anthology mini-series" titled MLW Azteca to premiere on Thursday January 6, 2022 on MLW's YouTube channel and FITE TV.

WWE lawsuit and new partnerships  
On January 11, 2022, MLW filed an anti-trust lawsuit against WWE, accusing them of interfering in television and streaming deals and poaching talent. Through the lawsuit, it was disclosed that a streaming deal with Fox Corporation-owned Tubi was terminated due to WWE allegedly threatening to pull their programming from the sibling Fox broadcast network. The suit also alleges that WWE pressured Vice TV to withdraw from negotiations with MLW. In February 2023, the lawsuit was dismissed due to a lack of "sufficient facts to plausibly allege a relevant antitrust product market" and that their "allegations are insufficient to plausibly allege a relevant product market." MLW was given 21 days to file an amendment to their lawsuit.

On July 5, 2022, MLW announced a new broadcast deal with Ayozat TV in the United Kingdom. Two days later, MLW announced an expanded agreement with beIN Sports USA to carry the promotion's programming on BeIN Sports Xtra, both through its FAST channel and across its over-the-air television station affiliates, on Friday nights.

On October 11, 2022, MLW announced a partnership with streaming platform Pro Wrestling TV (PWTV), bringing the promotion's programming library to the service. The partnership began on November 3, with the premiere of the Battle Riot IV event. MLW Fusion would return for a new season the following week on November 10.

On January 20, 2023, MLW announced a new broadcast deal with Reelz in the United States, with a new weekly flagship show titled MLW Underground Wrestling premiering on February 7. On February 28, it was reported by Variety that MLW's deal with Reelz would conclude after 10 weeks. In a statement made to PWInsider, the network confirmed that "No decisions have been made by MLW or REELZ and we are both committed to a good outcome for MLW, its fans and REELZ." On March 7, MLW filed an amended lawsuit against WWE, citing WWE's alleged interference with the promotion's deal with Reelz.

Touring and TV tapings

In the beginning, MLW would hold one show a month, originally from the Viking Hall in Philadelphia, Pennsylvania. By the end of 2002, MLW began running two shows a month and, in 2003, multiple shows in a weekend were held in New York. The first time MLW left New York was December 20, 2002, for King Of Kings from the War Memorial Auditorium in Fort Lauderdale, Florida. The promotion primarily held events in Florida prior to closing its doors in 2004.

MLW initially held shows in Florida since their revival in 2017. Soon after the debut of MLW Fusion in 2018 on beIN Sports USA, the promotion would once again resuming touring, returning to New York later that year. On September 18, 2018, MLW announced their debut in Chicago. On October 19, 2018, MLW announced that they would return to Florida to make their Miami debut.

From Fall 2020 until 2021, due to the COVID-19 pandemic, MLW would return to Gilt Nightclub in Florida to tape their programming behind closed doors. From July to December 2021, MLW programming was taped at the 2300 Arena from the promotion's home base in Philadelphia, Pennsylvania. The promotion would resume a regular touring schedule later that year, beginning with their second joint show with The Crash Lucha Libre that December.

Matches and segments from the 2022 Fightland event that were originally taped for MLW Fusion were later repurposed for the promotion's new flagship series, MLW Underground Wrestling.

Contracts 

In 2018, after the promotion was revived, MLW signed some talent to exclusive contracts. It also gave MLW power over the performers' dates. Their wrestlers are allowed to perform for other promotions but have to prioritize MLW events. MLW's roster mainly consists of independent contractors who have also appeared in other promotions (namely Lucha Libre AAA Worldwide and Impact Wrestling).

Partnerships
MLW currently has working relationships with Lucha Libre AAA Worldwide,  The Crash Lucha Libre, the International Wrestling Association, Dragon Gate, Revolution Pro Wrestling, and All Japan Pro Wrestling.

Championships and accomplishments

Current championships

Defunct championships

Other accomplishments

See also 
 List of Major League Wrestling events

Notes

References

External links 
 
 
 

 
Entertainment companies established in 2002
Organizations established in 2002
Entertainment companies disestablished in 2004
Organizations disestablished in 2004
Entertainment companies established in 2017
Organizations established in 2017
Re-established companies
2002 establishments in Pennsylvania
Professional wrestling in Philadelphia
Professional wrestling in Orlando, Florida